Yangchengphug College was a football club from Bhutan, based at Changlimithang, who played in the inaugural Bhutan A-Division, then the top level of football in Bhutan, but since replaced by a full national league.

History
They finished ninth in the inaugural season, with a solitary win against T. I. and Power and two draws against Education and Motithang College to their name. They were also the weakest attacking force in the league together with Education, scoring just five goals in the whole competition. There are no records available for any competitions held between 1987–1995 so it is not known whether they competed again, and there is no record of them competing in any future season for which records exist.

References

Football clubs in Bhutan
Sport in Thimphu
University and college association football clubs